Patrick Hetzel (born 2 July 1964) is a French politician of the Republicans (LR) who has been a member of the National Assembly since 2012. He represents Bas-Rhin's 7th constituency.

Political career
In parliament, Hetzel has served as member of the Finance Committee (since 2016) and the Committee on Cultural Affairs and Education (2012–2016). and the Parliamentary Office for the Evaluation of Scientific and Technological Choices (OPECST). In addition to his committee assignments, he is a member of the French-German Parliamentary Friendship Group.

Ahead of the 2022 presidential elections, Hetzel publicly declared his support for Michel Barnier as the Republicans’ candidate. He was re-elected in the 2022 French legislative election.

See also 
 List of deputies of the 14th National Assembly of France
 List of deputies of the 15th National Assembly of France
 List of deputies of the 16th National Assembly of France

References 

1964 births
Living people
People from Phalsbourg
Deputies of the 14th National Assembly of the French Fifth Republic
Deputies of the 15th National Assembly of the French Fifth Republic
The Republicans (France) politicians
21st-century French politicians

Deputies of the 16th National Assembly of the French Fifth Republic
Members of Parliament for Bas-Rhin